Marginella virgula is a species of sea snail, a marine gastropod mollusk in the family Marginellidae, the margin snails.

This is a taxon inquirendum.

Description

Distribution
This species occurs in the Red Sea off Djibouti and Yemen.

References

 Dautzenberg P. (1929). Contribution à l'étude de la faune de Madagascar: Mollusca marina testacea. Faune des colonies françaises, 3(4): 321–636, pls 4–7. Société d'Editions géographiques, maritimes et coloniales, Paris
 Roth, B. & Clover, P. W., 1973. A review of the Marginellidae described by Bavay, 1903–1922. The Veliger 16(2): 207-215

External links
 Bavay, A. (1922). Marginelles nouvelles de la collection Jousseaume. Bulletin du Muséum National d'Histoire Naturelle. 28: 76-81

virgula
Gastropods described in 1922